Farwell Island is an ice-covered island, about  long and  wide, lying between McNamara Island and Dendtler Island in the eastern part of the Abbot Ice Shelf in Antarctica. The feature was positioned by parties from the USS Glacier and USS Staten Island in February 1961, and was mapped by the United States Geological Survey from U.S. Navy air photos of 1966. It was named by the Advisory Committee on Antarctic Names for Captain Arthur F. Farwell, Chief of Staff to the Commander, U.S. Naval Support Force, Antarctica, during Operation Deep Freeze 1968 and 1969.

See also 
 List of Antarctic and sub-Antarctic islands

References 

Islands of Ellsworth Land